One Ocean View is an American primetime television reality show about eleven single New Yorkers looking for romance on Fire Island. It premiered on ABC and CTV on Monday, July 31, 2006. The show was similar to The Real World, another series produced by Bunim/Murray Productions, though the cast was only together on weekends, spending their weekdays living their normal lives.

The show's cast of eleven twentysomethings included four men (John, KJ, Usman, and Zack), and seven women (Anelka, Heather, Lauren, Lisa, Mary, Miki, and Radha).

One Ocean View created controversy among the typically publicity-averse Fire Island visitors.  The cast and producers were not welcome guests on the island while filming.

The show's premiere garnered a low 1.5/4 rating among those between 18–49. It was dropped from ABC's schedule after attracting only 2.74 million viewers on August 7, 2006, making it ABC's least-watched show for that week.

References

External links
 

American Broadcasting Company original programming
2000s American reality television series
2006 American television series debuts
2006 American television series endings
Television shows set in New York (state)
Television series by Bunim/Murray Productions